Awan Sharif is remote town in Gujrat District. It is the largest village of district Gujrat, Pakistan. It is the last town which connect Pakistan with Azad Kashmir. Awan Sharif also holds history as it was the first place which was attacked by India in war of 1965 Battle Of Chhamb - Jaurian.
The Tomb of Qazi Sultan Mehmood  a famous saint of this area is also situated here. few notables of this area are also buried in front tomb.

References

Populated places in Gujrat District
The famous Saint of AWAN SHARIF was Qazi Sultan Mehmood Awani(R.A).He handed over Astana Alia to his heir Sahibzada Mehboob e Alam(R.A).Sahibzada Rizwan Mansoor Awani is now Custodian of Astana Alia AWAN SHARIF.